Aulopoma grande is a species of small land snail with an operculum, terrestrial pulmonate gastropod mollusc in the family Cyclophoridae. It is endemic to Sri Lanka.

It is about 21-27mm in length.

References

Cyclophoridae
Gastropods described in 1855